Hibbertia florida is a species of flowering plant in the family Dilleniaceae and is endemic to New South Wales. It is a small shrub with oblong to lance-shaped leaves and yellow flowers arranged on the ends of branchlets, with twelve to twenty-eight stamens arranged around three carpels.

Description
There are twelve to twenty-eight stamens arranged around the three hairy carpels, each carpel with four ovules.

Taxonomy
Hibbertia florida was first formally described in 2013 by Hellmut R. Toelken in the Journal of the Adelaide Botanic Gardens from specimens he collected on Mount Dowe in 1993. The specific epithet (florida) refers to the carpets of yellow flowers seen on rock shelves.

In the same journal, Toelken described two subspecies and the names are accepted by the Australian Plant Census:

Distribution and habitat
This hibbertia grows in shallow rocky soil in forest. Subspecies angustinervis occurs in and near the Warrumbungle National Park and the autonym is common in Mount Kaputar National Park.

See also
List of Hibbertia species

References

florida
Flora of New South Wales
Plants described in 2013
Taxa named by Hellmut R. Toelken